Rollando Picchiotti (born 22 January 1940) is an Italian racing cyclist. He rode in the 1966 Tour de France.

References

1940 births
Living people
Italian male cyclists
Place of birth missing (living people)